Boguslaw Plich (born 2 November 1959) is a Polish football manager and a former footballer.

Plich played in the Polish premier league Ekstraklasa for Widzew Łódź, Legia Warsaw and Zaglebie Sosnowiec. Plich ended his career in Finnish third-tier club Rauman Pallo and has been living in Rauma, Finland ever since. Plich has coached several youth and women's clubs as well as Pallo-Iirot in the Finnish second tier Ykkönen. In June 2013 he was named as the head coach of NiceFutis in the Finnish women's premier division Naisten Liiga.

References 

Living people
1959 births
Polish footballers
Association football defenders
Footballers from Łódź
Widzew Łódź players
Legia Warsaw players
Zagłębie Sosnowiec players
Rauman Pallo footballers
Polish emigrants to Finland
Polish football managers
Finnish football managers